George Blackman (1897 – 22 April 2003) was born in Barbados and served as a Private in the 4th British West Indies Regiment during the First World War. Following the death of former Jamaican soldier Eugent Clarke in 2002, George Blackman was the last living man from the Caribbean who was known to have served in the Great War.

Black soldiers from the British Empire rarely saw front-line action during the First World War; they were usually assigned logistical or support roles for their white comrades. Blackman, however, saw action against the Germans and the Turks, fighting hand-to-hand in many cases, before returning to Barbados via the British base in Taranto, Italy.

After his return, Blackman was given no support from the government. He worked as a labourer for the remainder of his career.

On 6 November 2002 Blackman was featured in an article in The Guardian entitled "There were no parades for us", which highlighted the plight of soldiers from the British Empire who served in the World Wars, and who received little recognition from the British government for doing so. A few months after this article was published, he died in Barbados.

See also

 Stanley Stair
 List of last surviving World War I veterans by country

References

External links
Simon Rogers, Soldiers of the empire: "There were no parades for us", The Guardian, 6 November 2002

1897 births
2003 deaths
Barbadian centenarians
British Army personnel of World War I
British centenarians
British West Indies Regiment soldiers
Men centenarians